Pulau Jong or Junk Island is a  conical island about  off the southern coast of Singapore. The small island lies north of Pulau Sebarok and the former Pulau Sakeng (now merged with Pulau Semakau). The island is uninhabited, undeveloped, and largely inaccessible.

Etymology
According to a local legend behind the island's name, a Chinese junk invader was attacked by Malay s one night where the island now is. Just as the pirates were about to board the junk, the captain (the Nakhodah) awoke. When the captain saw the pirates, he uttered such a frightful yell that the sea spirit turned the whole junk into an island.

Ecology
The island is surrounded by a reef, has no landing jetty, and is composed mostly of cliffs. It is therefore extremely difficult to access the interior. Although the reefs are accessible to kayak, no formal expedition to study the island's interior has been mounted.

In July 2014, a private expedition was conducted with the permission of the Singapore government. An individual swam to shore, climbed the island, and recorded video footage of the island's interior. He found no evidence of terrestrial animals of any kind, and suggested that the island is inhabited exclusively by insects, spiders, and the occasional bird.

Some large-billed crows were seen in the trees by a bird watch group in February 2018.

References

Jong
Western Islands Planning Area
Uninhabited islands of the Pacific Ocean